The 1911 Arizona football team was an American football team that represented the University of Arizona as an independent during the 1911 college football season. In its second and final season under head coach George F. Shipp, the team compiled a 3–1–1 record, shut our four of five opponents, and outscored all opponents by a total of 16 to 3. The team captain was Clifton Howard Rolfe.

During the final game of the season against New Mexico, the bleachers with 400 persons collapsed, causing several minor injuries.

Schedule

References

Arizona
Arizona Wildcats football seasons
Arizona football